Orphnaecus dichromatus is a species of selenocosmiine tarantula, in the Phlogiellini tribe.

Taxonomy
This species was originally described as Chilocosmia dichromata by Schmidt & von Wirth, in 1991. In 2005, Peters changed the name to Selenocosmia dichromatus, and in 2012, West, Nunn & Hogg placed Chilocosmia (along with C. dichromatus) as a junior synonym of Orphnaecus, creating the combination Orphnaecus dichromatus.

Characteristics
O. dichromatus has 10 large (and some small) teeth on the chelicerae in a row. It also has 4-5 rows of strikers (also on the chelicerae), that are basally thickest and longest. The 3 rows 10 unequal coxal strikers are clavate (scimitar shaped) and arranged in a semicircular shape. The cephalothorax, coxae and trochanter are reddish-brown and the abdomen and other leg segments are brown.

References

Theraphosidae
Spiders described in 1991
Spiders of Oceania